Defending champion Nikola Mektić and his partner, Mate Pavić, defeated Dan Evans and Neal Skupski in the final, 6–3, 4–6, [10–7], to win the doubles tennis title at the 2021 Monte-Carlo Masters. It was the all-Croatian duo's second consecutive ATP Tour Masters 1000 title together and their fifth title overall of the year. The win also earned Mektić his first successful career title defense. The match was the second successive encounter between both teams in consecutive Masters 1000 finals. 

Mektić won the tournament when it was last held in 2019 with Franko Škugor, but Škugor did not return to compete. 

Pavić and Robert Farah were in contention for the ATP No. 1 doubles ranking at the start of the tournament. After Farah lost in the semifinals, Pavić retained the top ranking by reaching the final.

Seeds

Draw

Finals

Top half

Bottom half

References

External links
Main draw

Doubles